Sangwali is a settlement in Namibia. It is situated in the Zambezi Region 129.3 kilometres out of the region’s capital, Katima Mulilo. It is the  centre of Judea Lyaboloma Constituency and it is also the Royal Headquarters of the Yeyi people. The annual Batsara Batsapi cultural festival is hosted here.

Sangwali was a place of residence for David Livingstone in the 1850s before he proceeded further north. The settlement features a small museum outlining his life and work.

In the media
 Sangwali (2016) is the title of a book by Konny von Schmettau. It narrates the life of David Livingstone.

References

Populated places in the Zambezi Region
Yeyi